Ellen Virginia Holly is an American actress. Beginning her career on stage in the late 1950s, Holly is perhaps best known for her role as Carla Gray–Hall on the ABC daytime soap opera One Life to Live (1968–80; 1983–85). Holly is noted as the first African American to appear on daytime television in a leading role.

Biography

Career
Born in New York City, Holly is a life member of The Actors Studio. Holly began her career on stage appearing in the Broadway productions of Tiger, Tiger Burning Bright and A Hand Is on the Gate, then embarked on a television and film career. In 1968, Holly became the first black actress to be cast as a recurring cast member on daytime TV.

She guest-starred on Sam Benedict and The Nurses as well as landed the role of actress-turned-Judge Carla Gray on One Life to Live, a role she played from 1968 to 1980 and again from 1983 to 1985. Holly came to the attention of Agnes Nixon, the creator of One Life to Live, after writing a letter to the editor of The New York Times about what it was like to be a light-skinned African American. Nixon created the role of Carla and offered Holly a role on her show.

When Holly began on One Life to Live in October 1968, her African-American heritage was not publicized as part of the storyline; her character, named Carla Benari, was a touring actress of apparently Italian-American heritage. Carla and white physician Dr. Jim Craig fell in love and became engaged, but she was falling for an African-American doctor. When the two kissed onscreen, it was reported that the switchboards at ABC were busy by fans who thought that the show had shown an African-American and white person kissing. The fact that Carla was the African-American Clara Grey posing as white was revealed when Sadie Grey, played by Lillian Hayman, was identified as her mother. Sadie convinced her daughter to embrace her heritage and tell the truth. Holly left the series in 1980, but returned in 1983.

In 1996, she released her autobiography describing her life and struggles as a light-skinned black actress in Hollywood. According to her autobiography One Life: The Autobiography of an African American Actress, she was fired from the show by new executive producer Paul Rauch in 1985. Holly returned to daytime in the long-term recurring role of a judge on Guiding Light from 1989 until 1993. She made a return to the small screen in 2002 when she appeared as Selena Frey in the TV movie 10,000 Black Men Named George, alongside Andre Braugher and Mario Van Peebles.

Personal life
Ellen Holly was born in New York to William Garnet Holly and Grace Holly. Holly is Black, and claims African, English, French, and Shinnecock Native heritage. Holly is a member of Delta Sigma Theta sorority.

Holly never married or had children. She had a relationship with her One Life to Live co-star Roger Hill who is also known for his role as Cyrus in the cult film The Warriors. In her autobiography, she wrote about her romance with Harry Belafonte.

Filmography

References

External links
 
 
 Ellen Holly at the Internet Off-Broadway Database
 

Living people
American soap opera actresses
Actresses from New York City
African-American actresses
American television actresses
20th-century American actresses
American film actresses
American stage actresses
Delta Sigma Theta members
20th-century African-American women
20th-century African-American people
21st-century African-American people
21st-century African-American women
Year of birth missing (living people)